Mount Pearson is a prominent snow peak (2,440 m) situated at the west side of the mouth of Lensen Glacier where the latter joins Pearl Harbor Glacier, in the Victory Mountains, Victoria Land. Named by the northern party of NZFMCAE, 1962–63, for F.H. Pearson, surveyor with the party.

Mountains of Victoria Land
Borchgrevink Coast